Uasin Gishu County is one of the 47 counties of Kenya located in the former Rift Valley Province. Eldoret has the county's largest population center as well as its administrative and commercial center. “It lies between longitudes 34 degrees 50’ east and 35 degrees 37’ West and latitudes 0 degrees 03’ South and 0 degrees 55’ North. It is a highland plateau with altitudes falling gently from 2,700 meters above sea level to about 1,500 meters above sea level. The topography is higher to the east and declines gently towards the western border”.

Uasin Gishu is located on a plateau and has a cool and temperate climate. The county borders Trans-Nzoia County to the north, Elgeyo-Marakwet and Baringo counties to the east, Kericho county to the south, Nandi county to the south, south-west and Kakamega county to the west.

Etymology

The county's name comes from the Maasai word Illwuasin-kishu. The land was the grazing area of the clan. They surrendered the land to the colonial government in the Anglo-Maasai agreement of 1911, and were subsequently pushed towards Trans Mara District. The plateau that they once occupied was then registered in its Anglicised version, Uasin Gishu.

History
In 1903, the area was proposed as a potential Jewish homeland, as the British Uganda Programme.  This proposal was rejected by the British Jewish community leaders.

In 1908, fifty eight families of Afrikaans-speaking South Africans settled in Uasin Gishu plateau. They were followed by sixty more families in 1911 and more later. The town of Eldoret was established in the midst of the farms they created.

Population

Government

Urban areas

Constituencies

Uasin Gishu Sub-counties 
Uasin Gishu is divided into six sub-counties namely: Turbo - with a Total of six wards; Kesses - With a Total of four wards; Moiben - With a Total of Five wards; Kapseret - with a total of five wards; Ainabkoi and Soy - With a Total of Seven wards. The sub-counties boundaries also correspond with the electoral constituencies in the counties.

Each Sub County has an administrative office in charge of it from the county Government. Wards administrators are in charge of wards and Sub County administrators admin the sub Counties.

Economy

Agriculture

Uasin Gishu along with neighboring Trans-Nzoia, are considered Kenya's breadbasket due to their large-scale maize and wheat farms which produce the bulk of the country's total harvest.

The National Cereals Board has a cereal storage depot located at Moi's Bridge town located in the north of the county, which consists of eight large silos with a capacity of approximately 5 million tonnes of grain. It is one of the largest in the country and plays a significant role in Kenya's food security.

The county also produces sizable quantities of milk and horticultural produce. A wide variety of crops and animals are produced in smaller quantities.

Aquaculture
The county has 1,728 operational fish ponds covering 486,000 m2 with annual fish production of 593,000 kg worth KShs 285,900,000. The county also has many private and public dams suitable for capture fisheries with an annual production of 33,048 kg worth KShs 9,914,400.

Industry
The county capital, Eldoret, is home to a vibrant textile industry as well as East Africa's only manufacturer of small arms and ammunition. There is also a substantial agribusiness sector that makes use of the produce from the county and surrounding regions.

Services
Eldoret is a major commercial center in western Kenya. Service industries like wholesale & retail trade, auto repair, entertainment centers and various IT services abound within and outside the town. Almost all Kenyan banks have a presence in the town and these act to service the region.

Tourism
Tourism, sports tourism in particular, is a growing sub-sector in the county - the result of long term performances by athletes from the region.

Transport
Uasin Gishu has 300 kilometers of tarmac roads, 549 kilometers of murram roads and 377 kilometers of earth roads. It also has 17 kilometers of railway line with 8 railway stations in addition to an inland container depot. The Eldoret International Airport and two airstrips are also located in the county, all combining to make it the regions service hub.

Education
The county has several universities including Moi University and the University of Eldoret, which have their main campuses in the county. Several technical and vocational institutes are also located in the county, including Eldoret National Polytechnic, Rift Valley Technical Training Institute, Kipkabus Technical Training Institute, Moiben Technical Training Institute, Kosyin Technical Training Institute, Chebororwa Agricultural Training Center, Tumaini and Technical Training Institute, amongst others.

Notable people
 

William Ruto (born 1966), 5th president of Kenya
Elisha Tanui (born 1983), world-class distance runner
Rachel Ruto (born 1968), First lady of Kenya

References

External links

bushdrums.com

 
Counties of Kenya